The Térénez bridge is a cable-stayed bridge, located between Landévennec and Rosnoën, Finistère, France.

It is 515 meters long, and connects Brittany with the Crozon peninsula.
It is a fan cable arrangement, with a curved deck.
Construction commenced on 19 April 2007 and the bridge was inaugurated on 17 April 2011 and opened for general traffic later that day.
It cost €35,000,000.

Earlier Bridges 
Slightly upstream from the current bridge stands an earlier suspension bridge.  Originally completed in 1925, it was destroyed in World War II and rebuilt in 1951 with the same concrete towers.  Over time, these towers suffered from alkali-silica reaction ("Concrete cancer"), and were deemed no longer rational to maintain, necessitating the current, cable-stayed design.

Design and Construction Process 
The bridge was designed by architect Charles Lavigne and consulting engineer Michel Virlogeux. The project was commissioned by Centre Expérimental de Recherches et d'Études du Bâtiment et des Travaux Publics (CEBTP) and co-contracted by VINCI Construction France, Campenon Bernard TP, GTM Génie Civil et Services, and Sogea Bretagne. Wind analysis of the structure was performed by Scientific and Technical Centre for Building. The total cost of the construction was estimated to be €35,000,000.

Structural Analysis 

Somewhat similar to suspension bridges like the Golden Gate Bridge and the Brooklyn Bridge, cable-stayed bridges like the Térénez Bridge use steel cables to transfer loads from the bridge deck to the towers. However, cable-stayed bridges actually are very different from suspension bridges in principles and method of construction. In a suspension bridge, the long cables are the primary load-bearing structures that are mainly responsible for the function of the bridge; for a cable-stayed bridge, the pylons form the primary load-bearing structures. For a bridge span of medium length, like that of the Térénez Bridge, a cable-stayed design is optimal from both structural and economic perspectives. Since the cables of the Térénez Bridge will not be exerting large horizontal tensile forces on the anchorages, construction of the bridge does not require excellent soil conditions. The deck of a cable-stayed bridge will also be stiffer than that of a suspension bridge, and therefore deformations of the deck under live loads are generally smaller. In addition, construction of a cable-stayed bridge will be simpler since the structure can be built by cantilevering out from the pylons.

Although Térénez is designed with an asymmetric form, observation of its cross-section shows that tensile loads in cables are transferred to the top of the towers in a rather symmetric manner. The top of each pylon is, in fact, located above the center of the deck’s cross-section, and cables are evenly distributed on both sides of the tower. Each pylon seems like a giant man standing inside the Aulne River with his legs spread out and steel cable arms holding the deck of the bridge. The “giant man” also directly supports vertical loads flowing down from the deck onto his “lap”. With both of the towers located on the same side of the bridge deck, it actually is reasonable to create a curved deck to stabilize the overall structure in the horizontal direction.

See also
 List of bridges in France

References

External links
Terenez Bridge by Jean LAURENT-GONNET in Cable-stayed bridge on Fotopedia - The Photo Encyclopedia

Cable-stayed bridges in France